William Edward Livingston  (June 25, 1832 – July 5, 1919) was a Massachusetts businessman, and politician who served as a member of the Board of Aldermen of Lowell, Massachusetts from 1867 to 1868, and in the Massachusetts Senate from 1875 to 1876.

Biography
William E. Livingston was born in Lowell, Massachusetts on June 25, 1832. He was educated in the Lowell public schools and at Williston Seminary.

He married Mary E. C. King in September 1857, and they had seven children.

A coal merchant, he also served as Water Commissioner, and as commissioner to supervise the erection of a new city hall and memorial building in Lowell.

Livingston died at his home in Lowell on July 5, 1919, at the age of 87.

See also
 1875 Massachusetts legislature
 1876 Massachusetts legislature

Notes

1832 births
Politicians from Lowell, Massachusetts
Massachusetts city council members
Massachusetts state senators
1919 deaths